Dea is the Latin word for "goddess" and may refer to:

Goddesses in Roman antiquity
 Bona Dea, a (mostly) exclusively women's goddess introduced from Magna Graeca
 Dea Dia, goddess of growth in Roman mythology
 Nenia Dea, goddess of funerals in Roman mythology
 Dea Matrona or "Divine mother goddess", goddess of the river Marne in Gaul
 Dea Sequana, goddess of the river Seine in Gallo-Roman religion
 Dea Syria or Atargatis, "Goddess of Syria"
 Dea Tacita, or "Silent goddess", goddess of the dead in Roman mythology

People

Given name
 Dea Birkett (born 1958), British writer
 Dea Ecker, German architect 
 Dea Herdželaš (born 1996), Bosnian tennis player
 Dea Klein-Šumanovac (born 1981), Croatian basketball player
 Dea Kulumbegashvili, Georgian film director and writer
 Dea Loher (born 1964), pseudonym of German writer Andrea Beate Loher
 Dea Norberg (born 1974), Swedish singer
  (born 1993), Miss Grand Indonesia 2017; see Puteri Indonesia 2017
 Dea Trier Mørch (1941–2001), Danish writer
 N'Dea Davenport (born 1966), American singer
 N'dea Jones (born 1999), American basketball player

Second given name
 Alma Dea Morani (1907–2001), American plastic surgeon
 Maretha Dea Giovani (born 1994), Indonesian badminton player

Surname
 Alex Dea, American composer
 Billy Dea (born 1933), Canadian ice hockey centre and head coach
 Gloria Dea (1922–2023), American actress, magician, and businesswoman
 Matt Dea (born 1991), Australian football player
 Jean-Sébastien Dea (born 1994), Canadian ice hockey player
 Kim Dea-jung (born 1970), South Korean sledge hockey player
 Marie Déa (1912–1992), pseudonym of French actress Odette Alice Marie Deupès
 Tommy Dea (1908–1986), Australian rules footballer

Other uses
 A character in the 1869 novel The Man Who Laughs by Victor Hugo
 A dialect of the Managalasi or Ese language
 An alternative name for the Zimakani language
 La Dea, a nickname of the Italian football club Atalanta B.C.

See also

DEA (disambiguation)

O'Dea, Irish surname
Deas (disambiguation)
Dease (disambiguation)

Feminine given names